Dario David Hunter (born April 21, 1983), also known as Yisroel Hunter, is an American rabbi, lawyer and politician. He is the first Muslim-born man to be ordained as a rabbi. A former member of the Youngstown, Ohio Board of Education, Hunter sought the 2020 Green Party presidential nomination, ultimately coming in second. He ran as the presidential nominee of the Oregon Progressive Party and elsewhere under the party label of Progressive Party in the 2020 United States presidential election.

Background 
Hunter is openly gay and was raised by his Iranian Muslim father and African American mother in Newark and Jersey City in New Jersey.

A former environmental attorney in Israel, congregational rabbi in Youngstown, Ohio and campus rabbi at the College of Wooster, he currently lives in Los Angeles, California.

Rabbinic career 
Hunter converted to Judaism, first through the Reform movement and then through an Orthodox process. When he was an Orthodox Jew, Hunter described himself as a "socially liberal conservative" and noted that he had previously engaged in "pro-Israel political activism." He was ordained as a rabbi in 2012 by the Jewish Spiritual Leaders Institute in New York City. As a rabbi, he later described himself as "very liberal and open minded."

A member of Jewish Voice for Peace, a group that supports Boycott, Divestment and Sanctions (BDS) against Israel, Hunter was fired from a position as a part-time rabbi at Ohev Tzedek-Shaarei Torah synagogue after he announced his run for the Green Party presidential nomination and critical comments he made about Israel were published by Cleveland.com. Addressing a Green Party presidential debate about his own change over time on the issue of Israel, Hunter attributed it to "realizing that you're wrong and then doing better and committing to do better as a human being...." He stated that though he felt "blacklisted" from the rabbinic profession, he would "continue to support the cause of Palestinians and human rights causes all across this world, even at a personal cost..."

Political career

Youngstown politics 

Hunter was a Democratic Party candidate for Youngstown City Council in the 2015 primary election, where he placed third, garnering 2.9% of the vote. In the 2015 general election, he won a seat on the Youngstown Board of Education, receiving 5.0% of the vote as a write-in candidate. In May 2018, he joined the Green Party, becoming the only Green elected officeholder in Ohio.

Hunter has been noted in the media for his outspoken stances on a number of school board issues, including what he sees as the Youngstown Board of Education's responsibility for low scores on state report cards,  ethics violations, nepotism, and creationism in the curriculum.

Hunter ran for re-election to the Youngstown Board of Education in 2019. He was not re-elected, placing less than one percent (0.53%) behind the fourth elected candidate.

2020 presidential campaign

Exploratory committee launch 

On January 21, 2019, Hunter officially announced the formation of an exploratory committee to prepare for a potential run in the 2020 Green Party presidential primaries. Hunter stated that America's divisions and inequalities demanded "a real national conversation about how to change the direction of this country."

Announcement of candidacy 
On February 18, 2019, Hunter officially announced his candidacy for the Green Party nomination during an event held in Pittsburgh. The New Republic referred to Hunter as "as diverse as candidates come..." Hunter stated to that publication, "If we want to cut through the lack of attention given [to Greens], we need someone who has a loud and clear voice and a tough skin." "It takes a tough skin to be an openly gay black son-of-an immigrant Jewish rabbi."

MTV.com highlighted his platform's inclusion of single-payer healthcare for all and "plans to transition the United States to renewable energy entirely."

Firing from synagogue over position on Israel 
Ohev Tzedek-Shaarei Torah, the Boardman, Ohio, synagogue where Hunter served as rabbi, fired him after his comments on Israel were published in a Cleveland.com article.  Hunter stated to Cleveland.com that he did "not believe the United States should be providing any form of aid to Israel or any human-rights abusers" and referred to Israel's treatment of Palestinians as "horribly atrocious". The synagogue originally attributed the dismissal to a  concern that his presidential campaign would take up too much time for him to perform his duties as a rabbi. They later cited the content of Hunter's statements about Israel as a reason.

Hunter has made fighting anti-BDS laws a part of his campaign, telling German paper Jüdische Allgemeine, "We will fight the attempt to curtail our rights to freedom of expression through laws that ban the boycott of Israel and the criticism of its human rights violations." Hunter is a signatory to Boycott from Within, an association of Jewish and Arab Israelis who support the BDS movement.

Bruce Zoldan's comments 
Bruce Zoldan, CEO of Phantom Fireworks, major Trump donor and board member of Ohev Tzedek-Shaarei Torah, stated in an email to the synagogue's board, "I will finance him [Hunter] if he promises to open and manage a gay bar for former Muslims with Jewish beliefs in Ramallah." Hunter, an openly gay convert to Judaism from Islam, told The Vindicator that he was "shocked and saddened" by Zoldan's statement and called it "homophobic and anti-Muslim."

Campaign tour 
Speaking to press in Carbondale, Illinois in June 2019, Hunter criticized what he saw as the use of children as "political pawns" in addressing immigration issues at the border. He called for better access to healthcare, a Bill of Rights for people of color, and vowed to end privatization in school districts. In Springfield, Missouri in August 2019, Hunter outlined an expanded Green New Deal – called the Green Path Forward – including an effort to improve diplomatic relationships with other countries, such as rivals like China and Iran, end war, stop the outsourcing of pollution and deal with environmental crises other than carbon emissions such as plastic pollution.

At a presidential debate at Ball State University, Hunter addressed systemic racism in healthcare stating, "We need to invest in making sure that we have a better healthcare infrastructure including in underserved minority communities.... We need more measurable, assessable standards for accountability to deal with the inequality in care and we need consequences."  In January 2020, at a Green presidential candidate forum in Charlottesville, Virginia, Hunter stated "We need to slash the war budget... [W]e need to invest instead in peace. We need to invest in a Department of Peace for active peace building across the globe."  Hunter stated that this policy goal would "lay the groundwork for how we will be instrumental as a nation in helping to save this planet – shoulder to shoulder with other nations...."

Visit to Israel 
Hunter visited Haifa, Israel, the day before April Israeli elections to meet with Reem Hazzan, the campaign manager for the joint campaign of Hadash and Ta'al. His visit generated press attention in Israel, with particular emphasis given to Hunter's advocacy for Palestinian rights and his reference to the area as 'Israel-Palestine,' a term also used in the Green Party's official platform.

General election run 

After Howie Hawkins was nominated at the 2020 Green Party Nominating Convention, Hunter announced via Twitter that he would continue to pursue the presidency as an independent candidate, citing alleged irregularities and undemocratic processes during the Green Party presidential primary. In August, he announced he would be on the presidential ballot in the state of Colorado under the party label Progressive Party. He also named Penobscot nation activist Dawn Neptune Adams as his running-mate.

On August 25, 2020, Hunter won the nomination of the Oregon Progressive Party.

Activism

Legal actions 
In 2017, Hunter filed a lawsuit against the Youngstown City School District in the Ohio Supreme Court for failing to provide public records. His request focused on a company contracted to hire principals for the district. The district settled with Hunter, providing the records and paying him costs. Hunter planned to donate the $100 awarded for court fees to the Boys and Girls Club.

In 2018, Hunter sued the Ohio Department of Education in the Ohio Supreme Court for failing to provide public records on an investigation into Youngstown's CEO for alleged inappropriate conduct. The Department of Education settled with Hunter, providing the records and paying towards his costs.

Electoral history

References

External links 

1983 births
Candidates in the 2020 United States presidential election
Activists from New Jersey
African-American academics
African-American Jews
African-American lawyers
African-American religious leaders
African-American candidates for President of the United States
American former Shia Muslims
American politicians of Iranian descent
American people of Iranian-African descent
American rabbis
Converts to Judaism from Shia Islam
American environmental lawyers
Gay politicians
Green Party of the United States politicians
Jewish activists
Jewish American people in Ohio politics
LGBT African Americans
LGBT rabbis
LGBT people from New Jersey
American LGBT politicians
Living people
Ohio Democrats
Ohio Greens
Academics from New Jersey
Princeton University alumni
University of Detroit Mercy alumni
University of Windsor alumni
Wayne State University alumni
Politicians from Newark, New Jersey
Politicians from Jersey City, New Jersey
Jewish American candidates for President of the United States
21st-century African-American politicians
21st-century American politicians
21st-century American Jews
20th-century African-American people
21st-century LGBT people